Rev. Leon Milton Birkhead (1885– Dec. 1, 1954) was an American Unitarian minister who opposed Nazi sympathizers in America in the 1930s. He was in dispute with Gerald Burton Winrod from the 1920s. As the author of The Religion of Free Man (1929) he suggested dropping "God out of consideration," and represented the humanist rather than theist wing of the modern Unitarian church.

References

1885 births
1954 deaths
American Unitarians
American anti-fascists